"Dream" is a song recorded by South Korean singers Suzy and Baekhyun, members of K-pop groups miss A and Exo respectively. It was released digitally on January 7 and later physically on January 14, 2016 by Mystic Entertainment. Written by Kim Eana and composed by Park Geun-tae and Jin Suk Choi, the song was described as a R&B song with jazz and neo soul sounds and lyrics about a couple falling in love.

"Dream" was a commercial success, having sold over 1.3 million digital downloads. It debuted at number 1 on the Gaon Digital Chart and remained at this position for three consecutive weeks. The song received multiple accolades at major South Korean music award shows in 2016, including the Digital Bonsang at the 31st Golden Disk Awards.

Background and release
On December 31, 2015, Suzy and Baekhyun were announced to be collaborating on a duet titled "Dream", described as a R&B song with jazz and neo soul sounds and lyrics about a couple falling in love. Two teaser videos for the song, the first one featuring Suzy and the second one featuring Baekhyun, were released on January 4 and 5 respectively. The song was released digitally accompanied by its music video on January 7. Physical copies were later released on January 14.

Shortly after "Dream" was released, Park Geun-tae, one of the song's composers, revealed that he had been working on the song for two years, and that it took one year to get both singers to participate in its production. He noticed Suzy in 2013 after listening to her soundtrack "Don't Forget Me" for the MBC television series Gu Family Book in which she also played the female lead, and later decided to choose Baekhyun as her duet partner.

Music video
Throughout most of the music video for "Dream", Suzy and Baekhyun are seen performing the song and interacting with each other while sitting on stools in the center of a vintage styled room, surrounded by a jazz band consisting of four men playing the electric guitar, double bass, piano and drum set. There are also brief scenes where they are seen presumably preparing for a date; Suzy sitting in front of the mirror at a makeup table and Baekhyun putting on a suit jacket. The music video ends with the singers giving each other high five and a fist bump before standing up from the stools and thanking the band.

Live performances
Suzy and Baekhyun performed the song together for the first time on December 2, 2016 at the 18th Mnet Asian Music Awards. On January 13, 2017, they performed the song again at the 31st Golden Disk Awards.

Reception
"Dream" debuted at number one on South Korea's Gaon weekly digital chart and remained at this position for three consecutive weeks. The physical version also debuted at the same position on the Gaon weekly album chart. The song won first place five times in total on South Korean music television shows Music Bank and Inkigayo. "Dream" went on to win Best Collaboration at the 18th Mnet Asian Music Awards, Best R&B Song at the 8th Melon Music Awards, and Digital Bonsang at the 31st Golden Disk Awards.

Track listing

Credits and personnel

Suzy – vocals
Baekhyun – vocals
Park Geun-tae – writer
Jin Suk Choi – writer
Kim Eana – writer
Choi In-sung – bass

Park Eun-ooh – chorus
Lee Seung-woo – chorus
Hong So-jin – piano
Jung Jae-won – recording, electric guitar
Jo Joon-sung – mixing
Choi Hyo-young – mastering

Credits are adapted from album liner notes.

Charts

Weekly charts

Monthly charts

Year-end charts

Accolades

Release history

References

External links

Baekhyun songs
Songs about dreams
2016 songs
2016 singles
Korean-language songs
JYP Entertainment singles
SM Entertainment singles
Kakao M singles
Songs with lyrics by Kim Eana
Gaon Digital Chart number-one singles